Scot Kelsh is an American architect and politician serving who has served as a member of the North Dakota House of Representatives, representing the 11th district, since 1997.

Kelsh earned a Bachelor of Arts and Bachelor of Science from North Dakota State University. He has worked as an architect and volunteer firefighter.

References

External links
North Dakota Legislative Assembly - Representative Scot Kelsh 
Project Vote Smart - Representative Scot Kelsh (ND) profile
Follow the Money - Scot Kelsh
2006 2002 1998 campaign contributions
North Dakota Democratic-NPL Party - Representative Scot Kelsh profile

1962 births
Living people
People from Ellendale, North Dakota
American Presbyterians
Architects from North Dakota
Politicians from Fargo, North Dakota
21st-century American politicians
Democratic Party members of the North Dakota House of Representatives